Haraucourt may refer to the following communes in France:

 Haraucourt, Ardennes, in the Ardennes department
 Haraucourt, Meurthe-et-Moselle, in the Meurthe-et-Moselle department
 Haraucourt-sur-Seille, in the Moselle department